The knockout stages of the 2017 Copa do Brasil were played from April 26 to September 27, 2017. A total of 16 teams competed in the knockout stages.

Format

In the knockout stages, the 16 teams played a single-elimination tournament, with the following rules:
Each tie was played on a home-and-away two-legged basis.
In the round of 16, quarter-finals, and semi-finals, if tied on aggregate, the away goals rule would be used. If still tied, extra time would not be played, and the penalty shoot-out would be used to determine the winner.
In the final, if tied on aggregate, the away goals rule and extra time would not be used and the penalty shoot-out would be used to determine the winner.

Bracket

Round of 16
A draw by CBF was held on April 20, 2017 to set the matches for the round of 16. The 16 qualified teams were divided in two pots. Teams from pot 1 were the ones who competed at the 2017 Copa Libertadores. Pot 2 was composed of the five teams that qualified through the Fourth Round plus the champions of 2016 Copa Verde, 2016 Copa do Nordeste and 2016 Campeonato Brasileiro Série B.

Seeding
2017 CBF ranking shown in brackets.

Matches
The first legs were played on April 26 – May 24 and the second legs were played on May 10 – June 1, 2017.

|}

Match 76

Atlético Paranaense won 2–0 on aggregate and advanced to the quarter-finals.

Match 77

Grêmio won 5–1 on aggregate and advanced to the quarter-finals.

Match 78

Flamengo won 2–1 on aggregate and advanced to the quarter-finals.

Match 79

Tied 2–2 on aggregate, Palmeiras won on away goals and advanced to the quarter-finals.

Match 80

Botafogo won 3–2 on aggregate and advanced to the quarter-finals.

Match 81

Santos won 5–1 on aggregate and advanced to the quarter-finals.

Match 82

Cruzeiro won 1–0 on aggregate and advanced to the quarter-finals.

Match 83

Atlético Mineiro won 4–3 on aggregate and advanced to the quarter-finals.

Quarter-finals
A draw by CBF was held on June 5, 2017 to set the matches for the quarter-finals. The 8 qualified teams were in a single pot.

Seeding
2017 CBF ranking shown in brackets.

Matches
The first legs were played on June 28–29 and the second legs were played on July 26–27, 2017.

|}

Match 84

Botafogo won 3–1 on aggregate and advanced to the semi-finals.

Match 85

Tied 4–4 on aggregate, Flamengo won on away goals and advanced to the semi-finals.

Match 86

Grêmio won 7–2 on aggregate and advanced to the semi-finals.

Match 87

Tied 4–4 on aggregate, Cruzeiro won on away goals and advanced to the semi-finals.

Semi-finals

Matches
A draw by CBF was held on July 31, 2017 to determine the home-and-away teams for both legs. The first legs were played on August 16 and the second legs were played on August 23, 2017.

|}

Match 88

Flamengo won 1–0 on aggregate and advanced to the final.

Match 89

Tied 1–1 on aggregate, Cruzeiro won on penalties and advanced to the final.

Final

In the final, if tied on aggregate, the away goals rule and extra time would not be used and the penalty shoot-out would be used to determine the winner. (Regulations Article 12.c). A draw by CBF was held on August 24, 2017 to determine the home-and-away team for each leg. The first leg was played on September 7 and the second leg was played on September 27, 2017.

|}

Match 90

References

knockout stages